Goodyear Theatre (also known as Award Theatre and Golden Years of Television) is a 30-minute dramatic television anthology series telecast on NBC from 1957 to 1960 for a total of 55 episodes. The live show was directed by many notable directors, including Don Taylor, Arthur Hiller (3 episodes, 1958–59) and Robert Ellis Miller (3 episodes, 1958–59). It followed Goodyear Television Playhouse (1951).

Cast
Actors appearing in the series included:
Vivi Janiss
John Larch
James Mason
Ray Milland
Edward G. Robinson
Gig Young
Errol Flynn
Michael Landon
Barbara Stanwyck
Rod Taylor
Eli Wallach
Cameron Mitchell
Robert Ryan (5 episodes, 1957-1958)
David Niven (4 episodes, 1957-1958)
Jack Lemmon (4 episodes, 1957-1958)
Jane Powell (4 episodes, 1957-1958)
Virginia Gregg (3 episodes, 1957-1959)
Peter Leeds (3 episodes, 1958)
Paul Douglas (2 episodes, 1958-1959)
James McCallion (2 episodes, 1958-1959)
Vivi Janiss (2 episodes, 1958-1960)
Willard Sage (2 episodes, 1958-1960)
Parley Baer (2 episodes, 1958-1959)
Dayton Lummis (2 episodes, 1958-1959)
Russ Conway (2 episodes, 1958)
John Doucette (2 episodes, 1958)
Pat Crowley (2 episodes, 1959-1960)
Jacqueline Scott (2 episodes, 1959-1960)
Chet Stratton (2 episodes, 1959-1960)
Lurene Tuttle (2 episodes, 1959-1960)
Tony Randall (2 episodes, 1959)
Charles Boyer (unknown episodes, 1957-1958)
Judson Pratt as Colonel Holt in "Point of Impact" (1959)

External links

Alcoa-Goodyear Theatre at CVTA

1957 American television series debuts
1960 American television series endings
1950s American anthology television series
1960s American anthology television series
1950s American drama television series
1960s American drama television series
English-language television shows
Goodyear Tire and Rubber Company
American live television series
NBC original programming